Pulchrana moellendorffi, also known as the Culion frog, is a species of "true frog", family Ranidae. It is endemic to the Palawan Island group of the Philippines. It inhabits streams and rivers in lower montane and lowland forests. It is threatened by habitat loss.

References

moellendorffi
Amphibians of the Philippines
Endemic fauna of the Philippines
Fauna of Palawan
Amphibians described in 1893
Taxa named by Oskar Boettger